Qillqa (Quechua for qillqa graphic sign, writing (the act and art of writing), Hispanicized spelling Quilca) is a mountain in the Wansu mountain range in the Andes of Peru, about  high. It is situated in the Apurímac Region, Antabamba Province, Antabamba District. Qillqa lies northwest of Hatun Qillqa ("big Qillqa").

References 

Mountains of Peru
Mountains of Apurímac Region